The sand leek (Allium scorodoprasum), also known as rocambole and Korean pickled-peel garlic, is a Eurasian species of wild onion with a native range extending across much of Europe, Middle East, and Korea.  The species should not be confused with rocambole garlic, which is A. sativum var. ophioscorodon.

Description
The sand leek is a perennial plant with an egg-shaped bulb. The plant produces two to five unstalked leaves, the bases of which are sheath-like. Each leaf blade is linear, 7–20 mm wide, flat with a slight keel, an entire margin and parallel veins. The edges of the leaf and the central vein are rough to the touch. The whole plant has an onion-like aroma. The inflorescence is a globular cluster surrounded by  membranous bracts in bud which wither when the flowers open. There are six tepals, six stamens and a pistil formed from three fused carpels. Mixed with the flowers are a number of purple bulbils. The fruit is a capsule, but the seeds seldom set, and propagation usually takes place when the bulbils are knocked off and grow into new plants.

Distribution and habitat
The natural habitat of A. scorodoprasum is damp broad-leaved woodland, forest margins, shores, hillside meadows and hedgerows. It was at one time used as a kitchen herb and can sometimes be found near old habitations.

Cultivation

A. scorodoprasum is edible but seldom cultivated, and has a shorter flower stalk and fewer and more inconsistently shaped cloves than Rocambole garlic. Sand leek also has a dark violet bulb wrapper.

Elephant garlic (properly A. ampeloprasum var. ampeloprasum) is also sometimes incorrectly sold as A. scorodoprasum.

References

External links
 

scorodoprasum
Plants described in 1753
Taxa named by Carl Linnaeus
Flora of Europe
Garden plants
Edible plants